Lars Rasmussen may refer to:
Lars Løkke Rasmussen, Prime Minister of Denmark
Lars Rasmussen (software developer), Danish Australian software developer for Google and Facebook, co-founder of Google Maps
Lars Rasmussen (handballer), Danish team handball player